Targeted alpha-particle therapy (or TAT) is an in-development method of targeted radionuclide therapy of various cancers. It employs radioactive substances which undergo alpha decay to treat diseased tissue at close proximity. It has the potential to provide highly targeted treatment, especially to microscopic tumour cells. Targets include leukemias, lymphomas, gliomas, melanoma, and peritoneal carcinomatosis. As in diagnostic nuclear medicine, appropriate radionuclides can be chemically bound to a targeting biomolecule which carries the combined radiopharmaceutical to a specific treatment point.

It has been said that "α-emitters are indispensable with regard to optimisation of strategies for tumour therapy".

Advantages of alpha emitters

The primary advantage of alpha particle (α) emitters over other types of radioactive sources is their very high linear energy transfer (LET) and relative biological effectiveness (RBE). Beta particle (β) emitters such as yttrium-90 can travel considerable distances beyond the immediate tissue before depositing their energy, while alpha particles deposit their energy in 70–100 μm long tracks.

Alpha particles are more likely than other types of radiation to cause double-strand breaks to DNA molecules, which is one of several effective causes of cell death.

Production
Some α emitting isotopes such as 225Ac and 213Bi are only available in limited quantities from 229Th decay, although cyclotron production is feasible. Among alpha-emitting radiometals according to availability, chelation chemistry, and half-life, 212Pb is also a promising candidate for targeted alpha-therapy.

The ARRONAX cyclotron can produce 211At by irradiation of 209Bi.

Applications
Though many α-emitters exist, useful isotopes would have a sufficient energy to cause damage to cancer cells, and a half-life that is long enough to provide a therapeutic dose without remaining long enough to damage healthy tissue.

Immunotherapy
Several radionuclides have been studied for use in immunotherapy. Though β-emitters are more popular, in part due to their availability, trials have taken place involving 225Ac, 211At, 212Pb and 213Bi.

Peritoneal carcinomas
Treatment of peritoneal carcinomas has promising early results limited by availability of α-emitters compared to β-emitters.

Bone metastases
223Ra was the first α-emitter approved by the FDA in the United States for treatment of bone metastases from prostate cancer, and is a recommended treatment in the UK by NICE. In a phase III trial comparing 223Ra to a placebo, survival was significantly improved.

Leukaemia
Early trials of 225Ac and 213Bi have shown evidence of anti-tumour activity in Leukaemia patients.

Melanomas
Phase I trials on melanomas have shown 213Bi is effective in causing tumour regression.

Solid tumours
The short path length of alpha particles in tissue, which makes them well suited to treatment of the above types of disease, is a negative when it comes to treatment of larger bodies of solid tumour by intravenous injection. Potential methods to solve this problem of delivery exist, such as direct intratumoral injection and anti-angiogenic drugs. Limited treatment experience of low grade malignant gliomas has shown possible efficacy.

See also
Unsealed source radiotherapy
Selective internal radiation therapy

References

Nuclear technology
Nuclear medicine
Medical physics
Cancer treatments